Vern is a masculine given name, often a short form (hypocorism) of Vernon, Lavern or other names. People named Vern include:

 Vernon Vern Bakalich (1929–2015), New Zealand rugby league player
 Verdi Vern Barberis (1928–2005), Australian weightlifter
 Vernon Vern Buchanan (born 1951), American politician, member of the U.S. House of Representatives from Florida
 Vern Bullough (1928–2006), American historian and sexologist
 Vernon Vern Burke (born 1941), American former National Football League player
 Vernon Vern Clark (born 1944), former US Navy admiral and Chief of Naval Operations
 Lavern Vern Corbin, American college basketball player (1926–1929)
 Vernon Vern Countryman (1917–1999), American Harvard Law School professor and social critic
 Vern Den Herder (born 1948), American retired National Football League player and member of the College Football Hall of Fame
 Vern Fleming (born 1962), American former National Basketball Association player
 Vern Fonk (1930–2006), American entrepreneur best known for founding Vern Fonk Insurance, a high-risk auto insurance agency
 Vern Gardner (1925–1987), American National Basketball Association player
 Vernon Vern Gosdin (1934–2009), American country music singer
 Vernon Arnold Haugland (1908–1984), American reporter, war correspondent and writer
 Vernon Vern Kaiser (1925–2011), Canadian National Hockey League player
 Vern Oliver Knudsen (1893–1974), American acoustical physicist
 Vern Krishna, Canadian law professor and accountant
 Vernon Vern Law (born 1930), American retired Major League Baseball pitcher
 Arild Verner Vern Mikkelsen (1928–2013), American National Basketball Association player
 Vern Miller (1928–2021), American attorney, former police officer, and former Attorney General of Kansas
 Vern Moore (footballer) (1895–1955), Australian rules footballer
 Vern Mullen (1900–1980), American National Football League player
 Vern Paxson, Professor of Computer Science at the University of California, Berkeley
 Vern Poore, American Oscar-winning sound engineer
 Vern Poythress (born 1946), American Calvinist philosopher, theologian and New Testament scholar
 Lavern Vern Pyles, American politician, former member of the Pennsylvania House of Representatives (1975–1980)
 Vernal Vern Riffe Jr. (1925–1997), American politician, longest serving speaker of the Ohio House of Representatives
 Vernon Vern Roberson (born 1952), American former National Football League and Canadian Football League player
 Vern Rutsala (1934–2014), American poet
 Vern L. Schramm (born 1941), American biochemist and professor
 Vern Smith (journalist) (1892–?), American communist, journalist and editor
 Vernon Vern Sneider (1916–1981), American novelist best known for The Teahouse of the August Moon
 Vernon Vern Stephens (1920–1968), American Major League Baseball player
 Verner E. Suomi (1915–1995), Finnish-American educator, inventor and scientist, considered the father of satellite meteorology
 Vern Swanson (born 1941), American politician, member of the Kansas House of Representatives
 Vern Taylor, Canadian figure skater (1970s) and coach
 Vern Terpstra (1927–2013), Professor Emeritus of international business at the Ross School of Business, University of Michigan
 Vern Tincher (born 1936), American politician, former member of the Indiana House of Representatives
 Delbert Lavern Vern Williams (1930–2006), American bluegrass musician

See also

Vern-d'Anjou, a commune in Maine-et-Loire, France
Vern-sur-Seiche, a commune in Ille-et-Vilaine, France

Masculine given names
Hypocorisms